Southern Catanduanes Bikol, or Virac is one of the Bikol languages of Catanduanes in the Philippines.

References

Bikol languages
Languages of Catanduanes